The women's 200 metres event at the 1963 Summer Universiade was held at the Estádio Olímpico Monumental in Porto Alegre in September 1963.

Medalists

Results

Heats

Final

References

Athletics at the 1963 Summer Universiade
1963